General Sir William Gabriel Davy,  (178025 January 1856) was a British Army officer who fought in the Peninsular War.

Life

William Gabriel Davy was born in 1780 in Kingsholm, Gloucestershire. He was the eldest son of Major William Davy, Persian Secretary to Warren Hastings, the first Governor-General of Bengal. Educated at Eton College, Davy became a lieutenant in the 61st Foot of the British Army in 1797. He transferred to the 5th battalion of the 60th Foot at the beginning of 1802, and was made a captain. He was promoted to major and lieutenant colonel on 5 February 1807 and 28 December 1809, respectively. After becoming the battalion's commander in May 1808, he led the battalion early in the Peninsular War.

The battalion departed from Cork on 12 July 1808. On 1 August, they arrived at Mondego Bay in Portugal, where the first British troops to participate in the Peninsular War landed; Davy's battalion was the first to land. The Battle of Roleia was especially difficult, as Davy's battalion was in the middle of the fighting. At one point, the troops ascended a mountain "so covered with brushwood that [their] legs were ready to sink under [them]." In December 1809, just after being promoted to lieutenant-colonel, he moved to the 7th Garrison Battalion. However, he never participated in physical combat again. He married Mary Ann Carruthers (née Arthington, daughter of Thomas Arthington and 2nd wife of William Aikman Carruthers) in Adel, Yorkshire on 20 June 1814. In July 1830, Davy was made a major general. He remarried in 1840, to Sophia Fountayne Wilson, daughter of Richard Fountayne Wilson, Melton, Yorkshire. The sister of the new Lady Davy was married to Major-General Sir Richard England. Davy was promoted to lieutenant-general in November of the following year. In November 1842, Davy became colonel of the 1st battalion of the 60th Foot. He was promoted to general in 1854. From his purchase of the property in 1820, Davy resided at Tracy Park, Gloucestershire. He died there on 25 January 1856, aged 77.

Honours
Davy was awarded the Field Officer's Gold Medal, a clasp, and a gold ribbon buckle for his service in the battles of Roleia, Vimiera and Talavera during the Peninsular War. He was also praised by distinguished figures, such as Secretary of State Lord Castlereagh. Davy became a Companion of the Bath in June 1815. King William IV knighted Davy and made him a Knight Commander of the Royal Guelphic Order in 1836.

References

Peninsular War
British Army generals
1780 births
1856 deaths
People educated at Eton College
King's Royal Rifle Corps officers